550 South Tryon, formerly the Duke Energy Center, is a  tall, 48-floor (54 floors including mechanical floors) skyscraper in Charlotte, North Carolina. When completed in 2010, it was the largest building in Charlotte (in square footage), second tallest building in Charlotte, 63rd tallest building in the United States, and the tallest in the world to use precast double tees.

History 

Duke Power chief executive Bill Lee had put together the property in the 1990s, intending to build Duke's headquarters there, but the company dropped its plans and sold the land to Wachovia.

Originally, the building was to be known as the Wachovia Corporate Center. It was to replace One Wachovia Center as the headquarters of Wachovia. Wachovia was to occupy  of the  tower. The first floor of the building was to contain the main lobby and elevators. The second floor was to have Wachovia's server room. The third floor would have been occupied by training areas during the day and classrooms at night. This area was to have been shared by Wachovia and Wake Forest University, which was to use it for its MBA courses. Floors four through seven were to contain the trading floor. It would have taken up  and housed approximately 750 traders per floor. Wachovia would also have used floors 36 through 48. In addition to the upper floors Wachovia would have used, Duke planned to use floors 15 through 22. Wells Fargo, which still owned the building, planned to occupy five of its 14 floors late in 2010. KPMG and Katten Muchin Rosenman moved into the building in February 2010, while Duke Energy moved later in 2010. 

Originally Sonnenschein announced it would lease  on the 34th and 35th floors and Deloitte leased  of space.
Wells Fargo, which took over Wachovia December 31, 2008, planned to use five of its 14 floors.  After acquiring Wachovia, Wells Fargo still had reserved  of space.  However, in September 2009 the company stated they were open to leasing out 25% of that space. At that time they were committed to using 10 floors of the building.  

Prior to Wells Fargo purchasing Wachovia, Duke Energy was planning to occupy  of space.  In February 2009, Duke announced it would occupy  and become the building's primary tenant.  The building was rebranded as Duke Energy Center.  Duke announced plans to occupy floors 15 through 22 and 36-48.      

However, Wake Forest pulled out of the project after the purchase of Wachovia by Wells Fargo.  

In August 2010 Commercial real estate firm Cassidy Turley announced it had signed a lease to occupy  on the 34th floor of the building.  The firm will taking part of the  formerly leased by law firm Sonnenschein Nath & Rosenthal in 2008.  In 2009 the law firm closed its Charlotte office.

The move gave the company a 50% space increase from its former space in Charlotte Plaza. The extra space is to support the company's 49% in the last 63 years.

In November 2012 Wells Fargo started utilizing  for several trading floors.  The new space could hold 1,500 employees spread across two trading floors.  It became the bank's largest hub for the bank’s investment banking and capital markets division.

Wells Fargo has announced it will exit its lease to One Wells Fargo Center at the end of 2021.  Currently it is the largest tenant with 500,000 square feet.  The company has been consolidating its Charlotte footprint with leasing the entire 300 South Brevard building, expanding their employee space at the Duke Energy Center following Duke's departure, and relocating additional employees in Three Wells Fargo Center.  Wells Fargo's departure will leave several large blocks of continuous space available which will include 224,776 square feet on floors 7 to 14, 148,469 square feet on 15 to 21, 59,132 square feet on 30 to 32 and 47,403 square feet on the top floors, 40 to 42.  As of December 31, 2021 Duke had exited its lease of the building.  All Duke employees left the building before the holidays.  The Duke Energy Center signs and plaques have been removed the building is temporarily renamed 550 South Tryon.

In January 2023 Wells Fargo announced it will be exiting One Wells Fargo Center and Two Wells Fargo Center by the end of 2023.  The employees from these two buildings will be consolidated into 550 South Tryon and Three Wells Fargo Center.  After consolidation is complete Wells Fargo will occupy 95% of the building.  The bank will be renovating 21 floors of the building and the food court.

Construction 

The project was announced in the spring of 2004, and official renderings were not released until December 6, 2006. The site preparation began with the demolition of a Firestone Tire dealership in February 2006, and on February 28, 2006, the excavation and blasting of a -deep hole for the below-grade parking garage began. Over  of explosives were used during its excavation and it took just over 60,000 dump truck loads to remove all of the excavated material from the site, some of which was used in the construction of a third runway at Charlotte-Douglas International Airport.

The building was constructed by Batson-Cook Construction, with ready mix products from Concrete Supply Co. and structural engineering firm TRC International Ltd, of Sarasota, Florida. The building core is constructed with poured-in-place concrete while the floor structures utilize precast double tees, a structural method typically seen in parking decks. These double tees span between the poured-in-place core and perimeter systems.

The building received a certificate of occupancy on December 23, 2009, with the lobby and parking garage opening on January 2, 2010.

Features

It is the tallest building in the Levine Center for the Arts (formerly the Wells Fargo Cultural Campus) and the largest building in Charlotte, which will have a  footprint. The complex will also include a 46-floor condominium tower (future), the Harvey B. Gantt Center for African-American Arts + Culture, the Mint Museum Uptown, the Knight Theater, the Bechtler Museum of Modern Art, and a History Museum. The building has achieved LEED Platinum status by including water-saving plumbing devices, a water storage system that will treat rainwater to be used for cooling tower make-up water, and a green roof. Rock that was blasted for the parking structure is being recycled by hauling it to a local quarry, where it will be crushed for gravel.

The facade of the structure is illuminated by hundreds of programmable color-changing LED and metal halide luminaires with design work by Gabler-Youngston Architectural Lighting Design.  The facade lighting system provides various shows and effects. Due to the tower's high visibility over the east corner of Bank of America Stadium, the LED lights are used during key moments of sporting events played there. For example, if the Carolina Panthers are playing, the tower lights up blue for Panthers touchdowns. During the ACC Championship Game, whenever a team scores a touchdown, it lights up in that team's color.

See also
List of tallest buildings in Charlotte
Levine Center for the Arts
List of tallest buildings in North Carolina
List of tallest buildings in the United States
Duke Energy Plaza

References

External links 

Skyscraper office buildings in Charlotte, North Carolina
Office buildings completed in 2010
Duke Energy
Skyscrapers in Charlotte, North Carolina